Arctic Bay (Inuktitut syllabics: ᐃᒃᐱᐊᕐᔪᒃ, Ikpiarjuk "the pocket") is an Inuit hamlet located in the northern part of the Borden Peninsula on Baffin Island in the Qikiqtaaluk Region of Nunavut, Canada. Arctic Bay is located in the Eastern Time Zone although it is quite close to the time zone boundary. The predominant languages are Inuktitut and English. Arctic Bay is notable for being the birthplace of the former Premier of Nunavut and, as of 2021, the Commissioner of Nunavut, Eva Aariak. It is the northern most public community in Canada, not formed from forced relocation.

History 

The Arctic Bay area has been occupied for nearly 5000 years by Inuit migrating from the west. In 1872, a European whaling ship, the Arctic, captained by Willie Adams, passed through and gave the area its English name. It has the lowest tidal range in Canada.

The Inuktitut name for Arctic Bay is Ikpiarjuk which means "the pocket" in English. This name describes the high hills that surround the almost landlocked bay. To the southeast, the flat-topped King George V Mountain dominates the landscape of the hamlet. The community is served by annual supply sealift, and by Arctic Bay Airport. There is also a road connecting it to Nanisivik, a former mining community just inland that is now closed. Residents had hoped to boost their housing and public facilities with buildings relocated from Nanisivik, but those hopes were dashed due to lead-zinc contamination. However, a church was relocated from Nanisivik to Arctic Bay in April 2007.

Nanisivik was officially closed in 2006. Currently all that remains are two small houses, the rest of the community was demolished and stored underground.

On 10 August 2007, Prime Minister Stephen Harper announced the creation of Nanisivik Naval Facility, to reinforce Canadian presence in the Arctic. The original plans have been downgraded after geotechnical problems increased the cost; it will now operate for four months a year as a refuelling station, primarily for the Harry DeWolf-class Arctic patrol ships. Construction began in August 2014 and the facility is planned to be fully operational by summer 2020.

In October 2020, clothing manufacturer Canada Goose and Canadian actor Ryan Reynolds announced the donation of over 300 repurposed parkas and boots to K-12 students at Inuujaq School. The donation came after a tweet from activist Koonoo Han, who had grown up in the community, drawing attention to the needs of the community.

Demographics

Recreation

Arctic Bay is host to multiple recreational events and institutions.

The Royal Canadian Army Cadets meet three times a week. This is a program under the purview of the Department of National Defence. Youth aged 12 and up are welcome to join and take part in a variety of activities. The cadets regularly practice marksmanship and do a variety of outdoor activities including hiking, camping, orienteering and the biathlon.

For adults, there are several sports teams and activities that meet regularly at the gym attached to the school. Basketball, soccer, volleyball and hockey are the most popular activities. There is a hockey rink that is open to the public during the winter months. There is also a community art class hosted every Thursday evening.

The Youth Council is actively involved in recreation. They run an assortment of events and activities for the community. Most recently, they have opened up a CAP (community access point) site at a local church hall for community internet use. Aside from almost daily internet access, this hall is also used weekly for the community Elders to gather and socialize. Various other activities and classes take place here.

The local Community Hall, also known as the Sea Hall, is host to a variety of recreational activities.

Outdoor activities remain quite common. While some residents maintain the traditional skills of their ancestors, most now hunt with guns. Tents are still hand made and used frequently during the summer months. Ice fishing is a common activity during the winter months. Seal and narwhal hunting are quite common to supplement food and clothing.

Common Canadian events also take place in Arctic Bay, such as the Terry Fox Run, which is particularly popular.

The area is popular for sport hunters coming to hunt polar bears although this may change with the listing of the polar bear as a threatened species. The current mayor is Andrew Taqtu who is well known for his preservation of traditional hunting skills as shown on a BBC film A Boy Among Polar Bears.

Midnight Sun Marathon
Arctic Bay was home to the Midnight Sun Marathon, one of the northernmost contests held in the world.

Transportation

Scheduled flights to and from Arctic Bay arrive at Arctic Bay Airport. This airport was certified in 2011 after completing major construction of the runway and a new terminal building. Currently, regular flights to the Arctic Bay are available through First Air from Iqaluit and Resolute.

Prior to the existence of this airport, Twin Otter aircraft would use the main street leading into the town as a landing strip or used the Nanisivik Airport.

Education
The community is served by a single K–12 school, Inuujaq School, that has an enrolment of around 200 students. There is also a Nunavut Arctic College host site where the Nunavut Teacher Education Program (NTEP) is being taught. In 2009 many of the NTEP graduates, who are locals, will become teachers in levels from kindergarten to grade 7. As the only outsiders in the community are government workers, the student population is almost entirely Inuit and the first language spoken is Inuktitut.

Like most high schools in Nunavut, Inuujaq uses the Alberta educational curriculum. However, one challenge faced by educators in this community is that most students read at a lower level than their Alberta counterparts. As with most schools in Nunavut, the school is under the partial authority of the locally elected District Education Authority (DEA) who design policy as well as make decisions regarding discipline, spending, and cultural activities.

Broadband communications 
The community has been served by the Qiniq network since 2005. Qiniq is a fixed wireless service to homes and businesses, connecting to the outside world via a satellite backbone. The Qiniq network is designed and operated by SSI Micro. In 2017, the network was upgraded to 4G LTE technology, and 2G-GSM for mobile voice.

Climate
Arctic Bay experiences a tundra climate (Köppen: ET) like most northern Canadian territories at low elevations, with long, very cold winters and short, cool to cold summers. July is the only month with an average low temperature above freezing. Its climate does not differ from the more severe subarctic climates except for the practically non-existent summer (even Svalbard, an island to the north, has much warmer summers). Even in summer, the average temperature at dawn can be below freezing. The amount of precipitation is of a desert climate, below , and the days of snow is comparable to a coastal city of a lake or sea in the middle latitudes, but low for the location. Most precipitation is between summer and early fall. With the thawing process of permafrost, some communities such as Arctic Bay may be affected by flooding due to the melting of sea ice and erosion due to the mechanical process of temperature changes and their own variation.

See also
List of municipalities in Nunavut

References

Further reading

 Hoppner, K., J. M. McLaughlan, B. G. Shah, J. N. Thompson, Joyce Beare-Rogers, J. Ellestad-Sayed, and O. Schaefer. Nutrient Levels of Some Foods of Eskimos from Arctic Bay, N.W.T., Canada. Journal of the American Dietetic Association, Vol.73,No.3, September. 1978.
 Innuksuk, Rhoda, and Susan Cowan. We Don't Live in Snow Houses Now Reflections of Arctic Bay. Ottawa, Ontario, Canada: Canadian Arctic Producers, 1976. 
 Oakes, Jill E. Factors Influencing Kamik Production in Arctic Bay, Northwest Territories. Mercury series. Ottawa, Ontario, Canada: National Museum of Canada, 1987. 
Calgary, Alberta, Canada: Environmental Sciences Centre (Kananaskis), University of Calgary, 1974.
 Vipond JC. 2003. "Experience at the Arctic Bay Nursing Station on the Coast of Baffin Island". Canadian Medical Association Journal. 169, no. 12: 1305–7.

External links

 Arctic Bay at the Qikiqtani Inuit Association

Bays of Baffin Island
Populated places in Arctic Canada
Hudson's Bay Company trading posts in Nunavut
Hamlets in the Qikiqtaaluk Region
Road-inaccessible communities of Nunavut
Populated places in Baffin Island